Jamia (جامعة jāmi‘a; also jamiya[h]) is the Arabic word for gathering. It can also refer to a book Al-Jami'a or a mosque, or more generally, a university. In the latter sense it refers in official usage to a modern university, based on the Western model, as opposed to the medieval madrasa. The term seems to be a translation of "university" or the French "université" and emerged in the middle of the 19th century; the earliest definite use in this sense appears in 1906 in Egypt.

References 

Islamic terminology